Christopher William Roberson (born August 23, 1979) is an American-born Mexican professional baseball outfielder for the Acereros de Monclova of the Mexican League. He was drafted by the Philadelphia Phillies in the 9th round of the 2001 MLB June Amateur Draft.

Career
Roberson graduated from El Cerrito High School in El Cerrito in 1997, and attended both Contra Costa College and Feather River College. He was drafted by the Philadelphia Phillies in the 9th round of the 2001 MLB June Amateur Draft.

Philadelphia Phillies
After graduating, Roberson played on the Clearwater Threshers, a Phillies farm team, and had a twenty-three game hit streak. Playing for the Reading Phillies, Roberson was named the 2005 Eastern League Rookie of the Year. After starting center fielder Aaron Rowand crashed into the outfield wall at Citizens Bank Park on May 11, 2006, Roberson was called up to play the center field position, along with Shane Victorino. Roberson made his major league debut on May 12, 2006, against the Cincinnati Reds.

Baltimore Orioles
Out of options, Roberson was traded to the Baltimore Orioles in January 2008 for cash. In February 2008, Roberson was assigned to the Norfolk Tides of the International League. He became a free agent at the end of the season.

Arizona Diamondbacks
In January 2009, Roberson signed a minor league contract with the Arizona Diamondbacks. After spending the 2009 season with the Reno Aces, he was again granted free agency.

Sultanes de Monterrey
In 2010, he signed with Sultanes de Monterrey of the Mexican League. While in Mexico, Roberson has also played for Liga Mexicana del Pacífico teams Naranjeros de Hermosillo and Águilas de Mexicali. He played for the club during the 2010 and 2011 campaigns.

Winnipeg Goldeyes
In 2012, he played for the Winnipeg Goldeyes in the American Association.

Sultanes de Monterrey (second stint)
Roberson joined the Sultanes de Monterrey of the Mexican League for part of the 2012 season. He played for the club in every season through 2019. He resigned with the club for the 2020 season, but did not play in a game due to the cancellation of the Mexican League season because of the COVID-19 pandemic.

Bravos de León
On February 2, 2021, Roberson was traded to the Bravos de León of the Mexican League. In 2021, he batted .289/.353/.493 with 11 home runs and 35 RBIs in 51 games. In 2022, he started the season batting .363/.442/.611 with 6 home runs and 30 RBIs in 30 games.

Acereros de Monclova
On May 28, 2022, Roberson was traded to the Acereros de Monclova of the Mexican League in exchange for OF Alán García, and the rights to P Alejandro Chávez (for 2022 and 2023) and P Juan Pablo Téllez (for 2022).

International career
He was selected for the Mexico national baseball team at the 2017 World Baseball Classic.

On March 7, 2019, he was replaced by Jesús Fabela at the 2019 exhibition games against Japan.

Personal
After moving to Mexico, Roberson married Yaneth Hurtado, with whom he has two daughters and one son, and later became a citizen of the country.

References

External links

Mexican Baseball League

1979 births
Living people
Acereros de Monclova players
African-American baseball players
Águilas Cibaeñas players
American expatriate baseball players in the Dominican Republic
Águilas de Mexicali players
American emigrants to Mexico
American expatriate baseball players in Canada
Baseball players from Oakland, California
Batavia Muckdogs players
Bravos de León players
Clearwater Threshers players
Eastern Michigan University alumni
Feather River Golden Eagles baseball players
Florida Complex League Phillies players
Lakewood BlueClaws players
Major League Baseball center fielders
Mexican League baseball outfielders
Mexican people of African-American descent
Naranjeros de Hermosillo players
Naturalized citizens of Mexico
Norfolk Tides players
Ottawa Lynx players
Philadelphia Phillies players
Reading Phillies players
Reno Aces players
Scranton/Wilkes-Barre Red Barons players
Sultanes de Monterrey players
Toros del Este players
Winnipeg Goldeyes players
2017 World Baseball Classic players
21st-century African-American sportspeople
20th-century African-American sportspeople
American expatriate baseball players in Nicaragua